Schrage may refer to:

 Calvin Schrage (born 1991), American politician
Dave Schrage, American college baseball coach
 Elliot Schrage (born 1960), American lawyer and business executive
 Josef Schrage (1881-1953), German trade union official and politician
 Joseph Schrage (1818-1892), American farmer
 Lisa Schrage (born 1956), Canadian actress
 Mike Schrage (born 1976), American basketball coach
 Steven Schrage, American former government official, writer, educator
 Warren Schrage (1920–1999), American professional basketball player

Other uses
 Schrage (G.I. Joe), a fictional character in the G.I. Joe universe

Occupational surnames